Louis Westwood, better known by his stage name Kitty Scott-Claus, is a British drag performer most known for competing on the third series of RuPaul's Drag Race UK. He has been described as one of London's best known drag queens.

Career
Kitty Scott-Claus competed on the third series of RuPaul's Drag Race UK, where she placed as a finalist. Previously, she had auditioned to compete on series 2. Kitty Scott-Claus and series 1 contestant Cheryl Hole ("drag sister") are members of the girl group Gals Aloud. Kitty won two maxi-challenges (in episodes 7 and 8), she made it to the top 3 without placing below safe (in the bottom 2/3). She finished as a runner-up alongside Ella Vaday.

Filmography

Television
 RuPaul's Drag Race UK (series 3; 2021)
 Pointless Celebrities (series 15; 2022)
 Celebrity MasterChef (series 17; 2022)
 Love Island: Aftersun (series 8; 2022)
 Saving Grace podcast (episode 18, 2022)
 Queens for the Night (one-off special, 2022)

Theatre

Awards and nominations

References

Year of birth missing (living people)
Living people
20th-century LGBT people
21st-century LGBT people
English drag queens
Gay entertainers
People from Birmingham, West Midlands
RuPaul's Drag Race UK contestants